The France-Hayhurst family lived in Bostock Hall near to Middlewich in Cheshire, England from 1775, until the house was sold to the local council in the 1950s.  The family were responsible for a number of developments in the area, including the redevelopment of Bostock Green (now a conservation area) between 1850 and 1875. The family last appeared in Burke's Landed Gentry in 1972, as 'Carnegie (formerly France-Hayhurst) of Bostock House'.

The coat of arms of the head of the family was: 'Quarterly, 1st and 4th, Hayhurst (per chevron sable and or, in chief two crosses pattée fitchée, and in base a pair of wings conjoined and elevated, counterchanged); 2nd and 3rd, France (argent on a mount in base a hurst proper on a chief wavy azure three fleurs-de-lis or).'

Family members of note
 Commander Cecil Halstead France-Hayhurst (d. 1915), son of Colonel Charles Hosken France Hayhurst, as below; Royal Navy officer appointed in command of the destroyer  in 1902 as a lieutenant. He later served aboard , followed by HMS Patuca.
 Colonel Charles Hosken France Hayhurst (March 10, 1832 – April 7, 1914) Benefactor. High Sheriff of Cheshire, 1879
 Thomas France Hayhurst (1803–1889) Rector of Davenham 1839–1884, Honorary Canon of Chester
 Captain William Hosken France-Hayhurst, High Sheriff of Cheshire, 1929

External links
 National register of archives

References

English families
Middlewich